was a renowned Japanese photographer. Mitsuaki Iwagō is his son.

References

Japanese photographers
1916 births
2007 deaths